These 193 genera belong to Cicadinae, a subfamily of cicadas in the family Cicadidae. There are at least 1,600 described species in Cicadinae.

Cicadinae genera

 Aceropyga Duffels, 1977 c g
 Aetanna Lee, 2014 c g
 Afzeliada Boulard, 1973 c g
 Albanycada Villet, 1989 c g
 Ambragaeana Chou & Yao, 1985 c g
 Anapsaltoda Ashton, 1921 c g
 Antankaria Distant, 1904 c g
 Aola Distant, 1905
 Arenopsaltria Ashton, 1921 c g
 Ariasa Distant, 1905 i c g
 Arunta Distant, 1904 c g
 Attenuella Boulard, 1973 c g
 Auritibicen Lee, 2015 c g
 Ayesha Distant, 1905 c g
 Ayuthia Distant, 1919 c g
 Azanicada Villet, 1989 c g
 Balinta Distant, 1905 c g
 Basa Distant, 1905 c g
 Beameria Davis, 1934 i c g b
 Becquartina Kato, 1940 c g
 Bergalna Boulard & Martinelli, 1996 i c g
 Biura Lee & Sanborn, 2015 c g
 Borencona Davis, 1928 i c g
 Brachylobopyga Duffels, 1982 c g
 Brevisiana Boulard, 1973 c g
 Burbunga Distant, 1905 c g
 Cabecita Lee, 2014 c g
 Cacama Distant, 1904 i c g b  (cactus dodgers)
 Calcagninus Distant, 1892 c g
 Callogaeana Chou & Yao, 1985 c g
 Canualna Boulard, 1985 c g
 Capcicada Villet, 1989 c g
 Champaka Distant, 1905 c g
 Changa Lee, 2016 c g
 Chinaria Davis, 1934 i c g
 Chremistica Stål, 1870 c g
 Cicada Linnaeus, 1758 i g
 Cicadmalleus Boulard & Puissant, 2013 c g
 Cochleopsaltria Pham & Constant, 2017
 Cornuplura Davis, 1944 i c g b
 Cosmopsaltria Stål, 1866 c g
 Cracenpsaltria Sanborn, 2016 c g
 Crassopsaltria Boulard, 2008 c g
 Cryptotympana Stål, 1861 c g
 Cyclochila Amyot & Audinet-Serville, 1843 c g
 Daza Distant, 1905 i c g
 Diceroprocta Stål, 1870 i c g b  (scrub cicadas)
 Diceropyga Stål, 1870 c g
 Dilobopyga Duffels, 1977 c g
 Distantada Orian, 1963 c g
 Distantalna Boulard, 2009 c g
 Dorisiana Metcalf, 1952 i c g
 Dundubia Amyot & Audinet-Serville, 1843 c g
 Durangona Distant, 1911 i c g
 Elassoneura Torres, 1964 i c g
 Esada Boulard, 1973 c g
 Euterpnosia Matsumura, 1917 c g
 Fidicina Amyot & Audinet-Serville, 1843 i c g
 Fidicinoides Boulard & Martinelli, 1996 i c g
 Formocicada Lee & Hayashi, 2004 c g
 Formosemia Matsumura, 1917 c g
 Gaeana Amyot & Audinet-Serville, 1843 c g
 Galgoria Lee, 2016 c g
 Gudaba Distant, 1906 c g
 Guyalna Boulard & Martinelli, 1996 i c g
 Hadoa Moulds, 2015 c g b  (western annual cicadas)
 Hainanosemia Kato, 1927 c g
 Hamza Distant, 1904 c g
 Haphsa Distant, 1905 c g
 Hea Distant, 1906 c g
 Hemisciera Amyot & Audinet-Serville, 1843 i c g
 Henicopsaltria Stål, 1866 c g
 Heteropsaltria Jacobi, 1902 c g
 Hyantia Stål, 1866 i c g
 Illyria Moulds, 1985 c g
 Inflatopyga Duffels, 1997 c g
 Inthaxara Distant, 1913 c g
 Ioba Distant, 1904 c g
 Jassopsaltria Ashton, 1914 c g
 Juanaria Distant, 1920 i c g
 Kalabita Moulton, 1923 c g
 Kamalata Distant, 1889 c g
 Kaphsa Lee, 2012 c g
 Karenia Distant, 1888 c g
 Karscheliana Boulard, 1990 c g
 Khimbya Distant, 1905 c g
 Koma Distant, 1904 c g
 Kongota Distant, 1904 c g
 Lahugada Distant, 1905 c g
 Leptopsaltria Stål, 1866 c g
 Leptosemia Matsumura, 1917 c g
 Lethama Distant, 1905 c g
 Macrosemia Kato, 1925 c g
 Macrotristria Stål, 1870 c g
 Majeorona Distant, 1905 i c g
 Manna Lee & Emery, 2013 c g
 Masamia Lee & Emery, 2013 c g
 Mata Distant, 1906 c g
 Maua Distant, 1905 c g
 Megapomponia Boulard, 2005 c g
 Megatibicen  c g b
 Meimuna Distant, 1905 c g
 Minilomia Lee, 2013 c g
 Minipomponia Boulard, 2008 c g
 Miniterpnosia Lee, 2013 c g
 Miranha Distant, 1905 i c g
 Moana Myers, 1928 c g
 Mosaica Lee & Emery, 2013 c g
 Muansa Distant, 1904 c g
 Munza Distant, 1904 c g
 Mura Distant, 1905 i c g
 Nabalua Moulton, 1923 c g
 Neocicada Kato, 1932 i c g
 Neoncotympana Lee, 2010 c g
 Neopsaltoda Distant, 1910 c g
 Neoterpnosia Lee & Emery, 2014 c g
 Neotibicen Hill & Moulds, 2015 c g b  (annual or dogday cicadas)
 Nggeliana Boulard, 1979 c g
 Nosola Stål, 1866 i c g
 Odopoea Stål, 1861 i c g
 Ollanta Distant, 1905 i c g
 Oncotympana Stål, 1870 c g
 Onomacritus Distant, 1912 c g
 Onoralna Boulard, 1996 i c g
 Orapa Distant, 1905 c g
 Orellana Distant, 1905 i c g
 Orialella Metcalf, 1952 i c g
 Orientopsaltria Kato, 1944 c g
 Oxypleura Amyot & Audinet-Serville, 1843 c g
 Pacarina Distant, 1905 i c g b
 Pachypsaltria Stål, 1863 i c g
 Paranosia Lee, 2014 c g
 Paratalainga He, 1984 c g
 Paratanna Lee, 2012 c g
 Parnquila Moulds, 2012 c g
 Platylomia Stål, 1870 c g
 Platypleura Amyot & Audinet-Serville, 1843 c g
 Plautilla Stål, 1865 i c g
 Pompanonia Boulard, 1982 i c g
 Pomponia Stål, 1866 c g
 Prasinosoma Torres, 1963 i c g
 Proarna Stål, 1864 i c g
 Procollina Metcalf, 1952 i c g
 Psaltoda Stål, 1861 c g
 Psithyristria Stål, 1870 c g
 Purana Distant, 1905 c g
 Puranoides Moulton, 1917 c g
 Pycna Amyot & Audinet-Serville, 1843 c g
 Quesada Distant, 1905 i c g b
 Qurana Lee, 2009 c g
 Raiateana Boulard, 1979 c g
 Rhadinopyga Duffels, 1985 c g
 Rustia Stål, 1866 c g
 Sadaka Distant, 1904 c g
 Salvazana Distant, 1913 c g
 Sechellalna Boulard, 2010 c g
 Semia Matsumura, 1917 c g
 Severiana Boulard, 1973 c g
 Sinapsaltria Kato, 1940 c g
 Sinosemia Matsumura, 1927 c g
 Sinotympana Lee, 2009 c g
 Songga Lee, 2016 c g
 Soudaniella Boulard, 1973 c g
 Strumosella Boulard, 1973 c g
 Strumoseura Villet, 1999 c g
 Suisha Kato, 1928 c g
 Sulphogaeana Chou & Yao, 1985 c g
 Tacua Amyot & Audinet-Serville, 1843 c g
 Taiwanosemia Matsumura, 1917 c g
 Talainga Distant, 1890 c g
 Tamasa Distant, 1905 c g
 Tanna Distant, 1905 c g
 Taona Distant, 1909 c g
 Terpnosia Distant, 1892 c g
 Thopha Amyot & Audinet-Serville, 1843 c g
 Tibicen Latreille, 1825
 Tosena Amyot & Audinet-Serville, 1843 c g
 Trengganua Moulton, 1923 c g
 Tugelana Distant, 1912 c g
 Tympanoterpes Stål, 1861 i c g
 Ugada Distant, 1904 c g
 Uhleroides Distant, 1912 i c g
 Umjaba Distant, 1904 c g
 Unipomponia Lee, 2014 c g
 Yanga Distant, 1904 c g
 Yezoterpnosia Matsumura, 1917 c g
 Zammara Amyot & Audinet-Serville, 1843 i c g
 Zammaralna Boulard & Sueur, 1996 i c g
 Zaphsa Lee & Emery, 2014 c g
 † Camuracicada Moulds, 2018 
 † Tymocicada Becker-Migdisova, 1954 

Data sources: i = ITIS, c = Catalogue of Life, g = GBIF, b = Bugguide.net

References

Cicadinae